"Takeover" is a track recorded by Jay-Z for his 2001 album The Blueprint. The song is a diss track aimed at rappers Nas and Prodigy of Mobb Deep.

Background

This song was the first official LP diss track to publicize directly the hip hop feud between Jay-Z and Nas (although there exists several other rap records prior to this featuring disses from both Nas and Jay-Z toward each other). It samples the song "Five to One" by the Doors  and "Sound of da Police" by KRS-One. The first line in this song is taken from Jay-Z's verse in "Celebration" off of the Streets Is Watching soundtrack. The song also interpolates David Bowie's "Fame". Jay-Z originally performed the first two verses of "Takeover" as an untitled diss to Prodigy of Mobb Deep at Hot 97's Summer Jam 2001. While performing the line "you was a ballerina/ I got the pictures I seen ya" a photograph of Prodigy, as a child, dressed as Michael Jackson, appeared on the large screen. Aside from its role in the Jay-Z & Nas feud, "Takeover" was largely seen as damaging to Prodigy and Mobb Deep's careers.

References to other rappers
In the second verse, Jay-Z alleges that Prodigy (member of Mobb Deep) took ballet classes as a child and mocks Prodigy's small stature. Jay-Z further dismisses Mobb Deep as competition in the hip hop industry by pointing out that his career had more commercial success than they ever would, and dissing Mobb Deep's famous song "Shook Ones Pt. II". Mobb Deep replied to Jay-Z in a subsequent LP diss track, but their rivalry has more or less been overshadowed by the rivalry between Nas and Jay-Z.

In the third verse (which has 32 bars, while the other verses have 16), Jay-Z ridicules Nas's discography (at the time consisting of four albums) and claims Nas has a "one hot album every ten year average." Jay-Z referred to a widespread feeling from many hip hop critics and artists that Nas's subsequent albums after his legendary Illmatic debut were mediocre follow ups, and dissed Nas' famous song from that album "The World Is Yours". Jay-Z sampled some of Nas' lines for the chorus of Jay-Z's famous song "Dead Presidents II", and claimed in "Takeover" that he sampled it because Nas was using it wrong ("So yeah I sampled your voice, you was usin' it wrong/
You made it a hot line, I made it a hot song"). Jay-Z also questions Nas's street credibility and claims Nas has lied or exaggerated about his past in songs, with the lines, "Nigga, you ain't live it you witnessed from your folks' pad/Scribbled in your notepad and created your life/I showed you your first TEC on tour with Large Professor (Me! That's who!)/Then I heard your album 'bout your TEC on your dresser." (This is a reference to the Illmatic song "Represent").  Jay-Z also ridicules Nas's style, flow, and career decisions, with lyrics like, "Nigga switch up your flow, your shit is garbage/What you trying to kick knowledge? (Get the fuck outta here)" and "Fell from top ten to not mentioned at all/To your bodyguard's "Oochie Wally" verse better than yours/Matter fact you had the worst flow in the whole fuckin' song..." ("Oochie Wally" is a song by The Bravehearts from the collaborative album QB's Finest), and samples the song in this song when Jay-Z mentions it.

The song initiated one of the biggest and most hyped hip hop rivalries within the industry, and was generally well received by fans. At the time, the song's hard-hitting caliber was such that Jay-Z and many hip hop fans had felt that this song could have potentially ended Nas's career. On the contrary, however, the track merely served to reinvigorate Nas' career as he responded to "Takeover" with an unreleased version of "The General" as well as with a diss track of his own, entitled "Ether".

Jay-Z responded to "Ether" with "People Talkin", "Don't You Know", and a freestyle entitled "Supa Ugly". Jay-Z and Nas would release other subsequent diss tracks and records referencing the feud, including "Blueprint 2" (from Jay-Z's The Blueprint2: The Gift & The Curse) and "Last Real Nigga Alive" (from Nas's God's Son.)

"Takeover" was produced by Kanye West and samples The Doors' "Five to One" as well as "Sound of da Police" by KRS-One. 50 Cent swards Mobb Deep in his own diss song "Piggy Bank", by telling his rival Jadakiss "Jada don't fuck with me if you wanna eat, 'cause I'll do your lil' ass like Jay did Mobb Deep." Coincidentally, 50 signed Mobb Deep to his G-Unit Records imprint a mere few months later.

On Mos Def's 2004 album The New Danger, the track "The Rape Over" is essentially a revision of "Takeover", with a similar Kanye West backing track using the same Doors sample. Mos Def's rewritten lyrics criticize the hip-hop industry in general and attribute hip-hop's direction at the time to "old white men", "corporate forces", and substance abuse.

Chicago pop-rock band Fall Out Boy referenced this song in their 2007 album Infinity on High with the song "The Take Over, the Breaks Over" as a direct mention to the rivalry.

In 2007 Mistah F.A.B. used the beat from the track on his Royce da 5'9" diss track entitled "C.I.A."

Accolades
"Takeover" appeared at 51 on Pitchfork's The Top 500 Tracks of the 2000s. Ian Cohen writing a summary said:

Credits and personnel
The credits for "Takeover" are adapted from the liner notes of The Blueprint.
Studio locations
 Mastered at Masterdisk, New York City, New York.
 Mixed and recorded at Baseline Studios, New York City, New York.

Personnel

 Jay-Z – songwriting, vocals
 Kanye West – production, songwriting
 KRS-One – songwriting
 Eric Burdon – songwriting
 Alan Lomax – songwriting
 Bryan Chandler – songwriting
 Rodney Lemay – songwriting
 Jim Morrison – songwriting

 John Densmore – songwriting
 Robert Krieger – songwriting
 Ray Manzarek – songwriting
 Young Guru – recording, mixing
 Kamel Adbo – recording
 Josey Scott – additional vocals
 Tony Dawsey – mastering

Samples
 "Sound of da Police", as performed by KRS-One and written by Lawrence Parker, Eric Burdon, Alan Lomax, Bryan Chandler and Rodney Lemay.
 "Five to One", as performed by The Doors and written by Jim Morrison, John Densmore, Robert Krieger and Ray Manzarek.

See also
"Ether" (song)
List of notable diss tracks

References

2001 songs
Jay-Z songs
Song recordings produced by Kanye West
Songs written by Jay-Z
Songs written by Kanye West
Diss tracks
Hardcore hip hop songs